Chris Kavanagh (born 4 June 1964) is a British drummer, best known for playing in Sigue Sigue Sputnik and Big Audio Dynamite II.

Kavanagh was asked to join Sigue Sigue Sputnik because of his looks and attitude, and only after that was taught to play drums by other band members. He remained with them until 1989. Later he joined Big Audio Dynamite II after Mick Jones reshuffled the line-up completely. He left the band in 1995.

References

1964 births
Living people
English rock drummers
Breakbeat musicians
Big Audio Dynamite members
Sigue Sigue Sputnik members
People from Woolwich
Musicians from London
English people of Irish descent
English session musicians